2006 Denmark Open is a darts tournament, which took place in Denmark in 2006.

Results

Last 32

References

2006 in darts
2006 in Danish sport
Darts in Denmark